Kruhlaye or Krugloe is a town in Mogilev Region, Belarus. Kruhlaye serves as the administrative center of Kruhlaye District. As of 2020, its population was 7,600.

History 
The map  Magni Dvcatvs Litvaniae in svos Palatinatvs et Districtvs Divisvs (Palatinates of Grand Duchy of Lithuania and it's Division of Districts) by  Jan  Nieprzecki from 1749 shows it as Kruhla.

References 

Towns in Belarus
Populated places in Mogilev Region
Kruhlaye District